The Louisiana Tech–Louisiana–Monroe football rivalry is a former American college football rivalry between the Louisiana Tech Bulldogs and the Louisiana–Monroe Warhawks (formerly the Northeast Louisiana Indians). The two schools are located 35 miles apart from each other on I-20 in North Louisiana. The two teams have met 43 times on the football field, with Louisiana Tech currently holding a 29–14 lead in the all-time series. The game ended in 2000, following the Bulldogs' transition to the Western Athletic Conference.

History
The matchup began in 1953 as a conference game, following Northeast Louisiana State's move to the Gulf States Conference. After the Gulf States Conference dissolved at the end of the 1970 football season, Louisiana Tech joined the Southland Conference, while Northeast Louisiana remained a football independent school, and the yearly game continued as a non-conference matchup. The game once again became a conference matchup in 1982, when Northeast Louisiana joined the Southland Conference, before once again moving to a non-conference game following Louisiana Tech's departure from the Southland following the 1986 season.

The early history of the series was dominated by Louisiana Tech, as the Bulldogs won 20 of the first 25 meetings between the two schools. Following the end of the 1978 season, long-time Louisiana Tech head coach Maxie Lambright resigned, and Tech decided to hire Arkansas assistant coach Larry Beightol as their new head coach, instead of promoting long-time Lambright assistant coach (and Louisiana Tech alum), Pat Collins. Collins was subsequently hired as an assistant coach at Northeast Louisiana, before being promoted to head coach following John David Crow's resignation at the end of the 1980 season. Prior to Collins' first game against Tech as a head coach, he drew the ire of Tech fans by using insider information gleaned during his time as a Tech assistant to complain to Southland Conference officials and have the Bulldogs' star linebacker, Ed Jackson, declared ineligible to play. The game, dubbed the "Ed Jackson Bowl," quickly turned into a rout, as Northeast Louisiana dominated the Bulldogs en route to a 35–0 victory in front of 23,500 fans at Tech's Joe Aillet Stadium. Collins spent eight seasons as coach at Northeast Louisiana and went 6–2 all time against his alma mater. Following Collins' tenure, however, Louisiana Tech once again began to dominate the matchup, winning 7 of the last 8 meetings, with a 1989 game that the Bulldogs initially won on the field, but later forfeited the victory, as the only blemish.

In 2000, the matchup came to an end, with a 42–19 Tech victory in Monroe. Following the 2000 season, Louisiana Tech became a member of the Western Athletic Conference, while Louisiana–Monroe became a member of the Sun Belt Conference in 2001. Since then, both teams have played in different conferences, and the game has not been scheduled. In 2013, Louisiana Tech left the WAC and joined Conference USA.

2012–2013 Bowl Season
Following the 2012 season, Louisiana–Monroe was invited to play in the Independence Bowl in Shreveport, LA. Louisiana Tech was also invited to play in the game but instead chose to let the Independence Bowl's time deadline pass in hopes of an offer from another bowl that never materialized. The Bulldogs did not end up playing in any bowl game despite boasting the nation's top scoring offense. Several members of the media have speculated that Louisiana Tech's reluctance to play in the Independence Bowl may have been based on their reluctance to renew their rivalry with ULM, though Tech officials have denied that this was their motivation in seeking a different bowl game.

Attempted renewal
In the summer of 2013, at his inaugural press conference, Louisiana–Monroe's new athletic director, Brian Wickstrom, announced his intention to play Louisiana Tech in football every year. In a press conference with a local newspaper, Dr. Les Guice, Louisiana Tech's president, indicated that an offer would not be heavily considered, as the future out-of-conference schedule was full. Louisiana Tech's new athletic director Tommy McClelland confirmed that Tech would not pursue any games with Louisiana–Monroe, as they are "grow[ing] a national brand" and that playing Louisiana–Monroe could not help Louisiana Tech accomplish that goal. In 2020, the rivalry is expected to be renewed amid a slew of cancelled games due to the COVID-19 pandemic. On November 16, 2020, both schools announced that the November 21, 2020 game that was scheduled to be held at Independence Stadium in Shreveport was canceled due to continuing COVID-19 concerns within the Warhawk program.

Game results

Notes:

See also  
 List of NCAA college football rivalry games

References 

College football rivalries in the United States
Louisiana Tech Bulldogs football
Louisiana–Monroe Warhawks football
1953 establishments in Louisiana